Glenea montrouzieri is a species of beetle in the family Cerambycidae. It was described by James Thomson in 1865.

Varietas
 Glenea montrouzieri var. celebica Breuning, 1958
 Glenea montrouzieri var. latania Pascoe, 1867

References

montrouzieri
Beetles described in 1865